High Synagogue is an inactive 16th-century Orthodox Jewish synagogue located in the Kazimierz District of Kraków, Poland. Also known as the "Tall Synagogue", the name corresponds to its height or, alternatively, because the prayer hall was situated upstairs. It is the tallest synagogue in the city and is an example of Late Renaissance architecture.

Early history

In the second half of the 16th century, a wealthy merchant known only as Israel submitted his request for building a Jewish house of worship to king Sigismund II Augustus. He obtained consent and in 1563 he commenced construction (some sources suggest the years 1556-1563). According to one hypothesis, the synagogue was built by Sephardic Jews, perhaps from Greece or Italy. It was the third synagogue to be erected in Kazimierz. The prayer rooms were located on the second floor above the ground floor shops. The interior walls of the sanctuary featured paintings of scenes in Jerusalem, including the "Tomb of the Israelite Kings," "Western Wall," and a handsome pair of lions in the women's gallery.

World War II
During the occupation of Poland in World War II, Nazis stripped the interior of all furnishings. However the seventeenth-century baroque chanukah candlestick, which was transported to Wawel castle, is the only element of the equipment of the synagogue that survived the war. Currently, it is on permanent exhibition in the Old Synagogue at ulica Szeroka 24. The ceiling and roof altered after the war, adding another storey above the synagogue. At present only the stone niche for the Aron Kodesh and the wall-paintings uncovered early in the 21st century by art conservation remain. On the eastern wall there is the largest and at the same time the oldest Renaissance Aron HaKodesh in Poland, the framework probably coming from the end of the sixteenth century, and the capstone from the late eighteenth century. Above the rectangular frame is a grotesque ornament in the form of two griffins, which formerly held the crown and the Hebrew inscription of Keter Torah, which means the crown of the Torah. The cavity is bordered by channeled pillars with composite capitals. During the conservation works, in 1971-1972, painted heavy curtains were discovered on the sides of the pillars, which disappeared over time.

The High Synagogue serves as a Landmark Conservation building. Since 2005 it has been open to visitors. Photographic and other exhibitions about customs and traditions of the Jewish community of the interwar period are staged indoors.

The High Synagogue of Prague was modelled after the Krakow's High Synagogue.

See also
 Oldest synagogues in the world
 Synagogues of Kraków 
 Remah Synagogue 
 Tempel Synagogue
 Old Synagogue (Krakow)
 Izaak Synagogue
 Wolf Popper Synagogue
 Kupa Synagogue

References

External links
 
  Virtual tour at YouTube.com

Former synagogues in Poland
Synagogues in Kraków
Renaissance synagogues
16th-century synagogues
Holocaust locations in Poland
Religious buildings and structures completed in 1563
Orthodox synagogues in Poland